Pieris bryoniae, the  dark-veined white or mountain green-veined white, is a European butterfly of the family Pieridae.

It is much sought after by collectors, particularly in Austria. This is because one of the most variable populations of this butterfly lives in the well-known Mödling area near Vienna.

There has been a long debate among experts as to whether it is an independent species or only a subspecies of the "green-veined white", Pieris napi.

The type locality of the nominate form is the Alps, where it is found at considerable altitudes (up to 2000 m) and has only one generation per year. Both pairs of the female's wings are dark. At lower altitudes, two or three generations appear during a year. Subspecies neobryoniae, closely resembles the Carpathian populations, and is found in the southern parts of the Alps and ssp. flavescens Wagner inhabits the northern parts. The ground coloration of the wings is yellowish or rich yellow, often with a mauve gloss. The populations inhabiting the Carpathians are very varied. The most distinct ones include the ssp. vihorlatensis found in Vihorlat, the east Slovak mountains. Others are Pieris bryoniae adalwinda Fruhstorfer, 1909 Type locality: Norway, Porsanger
Pieris bryoniae bicolorata (Petersen, 1947) Type locality: Schweden, Murjek
Pieris bryoniae bryonides Sheljuzhko, 1910 Type locality: Russia
Pieris bryoniae caucasica Lorkovic, 1968 Type locality: NW Kaukasus
Pieris bryoniae carpathensis Moucha, 1956 Type locality: Eats Karpates, Osa
Pieris bryoniae flavescens (Müller, 1933) Type locality: Austria, Mödling, Wien
Pieris bryoniae kamtschadalis (Röber, 1907) Type locality: Kamtschatka
Pieris bryoniae lorcovici Eitschberger, 1983 Type locality: Juliske Alpe, Vršic (North), 1400–1600 m.
Pieris bryoniae marani Moucha, 1956 Type locality: Slovakia, Zadiel Tal
Pieris bryoniae schintlmeisteri Eitschberger, 1983 Type locality: USSR, Jakutia, Tommot
Pieris bryoniae sheljuzhkoi Eitschberger, 1983 Type locality: Omsukchan, Magadan Gebiet
Pieris bryoniae sifanica (Grum-Grshimailo, 1895) Type locality: Amdo
Pieris bryoniae turcica Eitschberger & Hesselbarth, 1977 Type locality: Turkey, Anatolia, Ilgaz dagh-Pass, 1800 m.
Pieris bryoniae vitimensis (Verity, 1911) Type locality: Russia, Vitim
Pieris bryoniae wolfsbergeri Eitschberger, 1983 Type locality: Italia, Piemonte, Termi di Valdieri, S. Giovanni, 1500 m.

References

bryoniae
Butterflies described in 1806
Butterflies of Europe
Taxa named by Jacob Hübner